Nguyễn Tường Tam (chữ Hán: 阮祥三 or 阮祥叄; Cẩm Giàng, Hải Dương 25 July 1906 – Saigon, 7 July 1963) better known by his pen-name Nhất Linh (一灵, "One Spirit") was a Vietnamese writer, editor and publisher in colonial Hanoi. He founded the literary group and publishing house Tự Lực Văn Đoàn ("Self-Strengthening Literary Group") in 1932 with the literary magazines Phong Hóa ("Customs", or "Mores") and Ngày Nay ("Today"), and serialized, then published, many of the influential realism-influenced novels of the 1930s.

In 1935, Nguyễn published a satirical and fictional travelogue about his time in France, Going to the West (Đi Tây). His aim was to show that the French colonialists did not grant to the working classes in Vietnam the same rights they accorded to workers in France [Need Citation]. In addition to Nhất Linh, scholars have noted that the many Vietnamese westernized elites returning from France had been embracing the French “ideal of progress” as a lens to imagine Vietnam in a modern light of social equality and democracy.

In the 1940s he organized a political party, Đại Việt Dân Chính ("Great Viet Democratic Party" DVDC). Tam fled to China where he was arrested on the orders of Chang Fa Kwei, who at same time had arrested Ho Chi Minh. This faction soon merged with the larger Đại Việt Quốc Dân Đảng ("Great Viet Nationalist Party" DVQDD) and later this too merged into the Việt Nam Quốc Dân Đảng ("Vietnamese Nationalist Party" VNQDD).

After release from China Nhất Linh returned to Vietnam in 1945, to become Foreign Minister in the first coalition government of the Democratic Republic of Vietnam. He was chief negotiator with the French in Dalat in April 1946 and was to have led the delegation to France. However fearing Viet Minh assassination he fled to Hong Kong and resided there 1946-1950. On his return to Vietnam, to the South, avoiding politics and concentrated on literary activities. This did not prevent the accusation of the Ngo Dinh Diem regime of involvement in the 1960 attempted coup. Nhat Linh denied this, and the police having found no evidence did not seek to arrest Tam till 1963. Tam committed suicide by ingesting cyanide, leaving a death note stating "I also will kill myself as a warning to those people who are trampling on all freedom", the "also" probably referring to Thich Quang Duc, the monk who had self-immolated in protest against Diem's persecution of Buddhism a month earlier.

Works

Novels
Gánh hàng hoa (The Flower Seller) (with Khái Hưng, 1934)
Đời mưa gió (The Stormy Life) (with Khái Hưng, 1934)
Nắng thu (Autumn Sun) (1934)
Đoạn tuyệt ( The End) (1934-1935)
Lạnh lùng (Estrangement) (1935-1936)
Đôi bạn (Two Friends) (1936-1937)
Bướm trắng (White Butterfly) (1938-1939)
Xóm cầu mới  (New Bridge Hamlet)  (1949-1957).
Giòng sông Thanh Thủy (Blue River) (1960-1961).
Ba người bộ hành  (Three Pedestrians)
Chi bộ hai người (The Cell of Two)
Vọng quốc (Looking Back)

Stories
Nho phong (Confucian Mannerism) (1924)
Người quay tơ (The Weaver)  (1926)
Anh phải sống (You've Got to Live)  (with Khái Hưng, 1932 - 1933)
Hai buổi chiều vàng (Two Golden Afternoons)  (1934-1937)
Thế rồi một buổi chiều (It Happened One Afternoon) (1934-1937)
Thương chồng (Feeling Sorry) (1961)

Essay
Viết và đọc tiểu thuyết (Writing and Reading Novels) (1952-1961)

Travelogue
Đi Tây  (Going to the West) (1935)

Translations
Wuthering Heights (made 1960, published 1974)

References

Bibliography 
 

Suicides in Vietnam
Foreign ministers of Vietnam
Vietnamese writers
1906 births
1963 deaths
1963 suicides